Andrei Bodiu  (April 27, 1965, in Baia Mare - April 3, 2014, in Oradea) was a Romanian poet, literary commentator, Professor of Literature and publicist.

He graduated in Philology at the Universităţii din Timişoara in 1988.

In 1991, he published his first major work Pauză de respiraţie, in collaboration with Simona Popescu, Caius Dobrescu and Marius Oprea.

Selected works

Poetry
Cursa de 24 ore (1994);
Poezii patriotice (1995);
Studii pe viaţă şi pe moarte (Editura Paralela 45, 2000).

Critical studies
Direcţia 80 în poezia română (Editura Paralela 45, 2000);
Şapte teme ale romanului postpaşoptist (Editura Paralela 45, 2002);
George Coşbuc, micromonografie (2002);
Mircea Cărtărescu, micromonografie (2003).

Novel 
Bulevardul Eroilor, (Editura Paralela 45, 2004).

Further reading
 Ion Bogdan Lefter, Scriitori români din anii '80-'90. Dicţionar bio-bibliografic [Romanian Writers of the '80s and '90s. Bio-Bibliographic Dictionary], vol. I, Piteşti, Editura Paralela 45, 2000, p. 70-72.

References

1965 births
2014 deaths
Romanian male poets
Romanian literary critics
People from Baia Mare
20th-century Romanian poets
20th-century Romanian male writers